Susan von der Lippe (née Susan Gerard Rapp on July 5, 1965) is an American competition swimmer, Olympic medalist, and Masters world record-holder in multiple events.

She attended Stanford University, where she swam for the Stanford Cardinal swimming and diving team in National Collegiate Athletic Association (NCAA) and Pacific-10 Conference competition.

Rapp first qualified for the 1980 Olympic games, but was unable to compete due to the United States-led boycott of the Olympic games hosted by the Soviet Union.  Four years later at the 1984 Summer Olympics in Los Angeles, she had significant success.  She won a silver medal for her second-place performance in the women's 200-meter breaststroke, finishing with a time of 2:31.15.  She earned a gold medal by swimming for the winning U.S. team in the preliminary heats of the women's 4×100-meter medley relay.  Individually, she also finished seventh in the final of the women's 100-meter breaststroke, recording a time of 1:11.45.

Four years later at the 1988 Summer Olympics in Seoul, South Korea, Rapp competed in the B Final of the women's 200-meter breaststroke, finishing thirteenth overall with a time of 2:32.90.

At the age of 42, von der Lippe qualified for the 2008 U.S. Olympic Trials in the 100-meter breaststroke and 100-meter butterfly.

, von der Lippe holds 61 individual U.S. Masters Swimming pool records, across the 35–39, 40–44 and 45–49 age groups. She holds Masters World records in breaststroke, butterfly, individual medley in the 40–44 and 45–49 age groups.

See also
 List of Masters world records in swimming
 List of Olympic medalists in swimming (women)
 List of Stanford University people

References

External links

 
 
 
 

1965 births
Living people
American female breaststroke swimmers
American female medley swimmers
Olympic silver medalists for the United States in swimming
People from Eden Prairie, Minnesota
Stanford Cardinal women's swimmers
Swimmers at the 1983 Pan American Games
Swimmers at the 1984 Summer Olympics
Swimmers at the 1988 Summer Olympics
Medalists at the 1984 Summer Olympics
Pan American Games silver medalists for the United States
Pan American Games bronze medalists for the United States
Olympic gold medalists for the United States in swimming
Pan American Games medalists in swimming
Medalists at the 1983 Pan American Games